Axel Salzmann (born 30 September 1950) was a German pair skater.

Competing with partner Annette Kansy, Salzmann competed at the 1972 Winter Olympics.  They twice won the silver medal at the East German Figure Skating Championships.

Results
Pairs with Kansy

External links
Sports-Reference.com

1950 births
German male pair skaters
Figure skaters at the 1972 Winter Olympics
Olympic figure skaters of East Germany
Living people
Sportspeople from Chemnitz